Alan King (1927–2004) was an American comedian.

Alan King may also refer to:

Alan King (horse racing) (born 1966), British racehorse trainer
Alan King (guitarist) (born 1945), English guitarist and vocalist with the bands The Action, Mighty Baby, and Ace
Alan King, Scottish singer, member of Walk on Fire
Alan King (footballer) (born 1945), footballer for Tranmere Rovers, Ellesmere Port Town and Runcorn
Alan R. King (1954–2019), British linguist
Alan King (designer), American businessman and fashion designer
R. Alan King (born 1963), American soldier and author

See also
Allan King (1930–2009), Canadian film director